The Ecological Revolution for the Living (REV; French: Révolution écologique pour le vivant) is a minor political party in France, founded in 2018 by Aymeric Caron, who was elected in 2022 as its sole Member of Parliament.

History 
The party was formed on 8 February 2018 following dissatisfaction with Europe Ecology – The Greens.

In the 2022 French legislative election, Aymeric Caron of the Ecological Revolution for the Living was elected to the National Assembly in the 18th constituency of Paris with the support of the New Ecological and Social People's Union alliance. Upon taking office, Caron, who became the party's sole Member of Parliament, chose to sit with the La France Insoumise group rather than as an independent.

Ideology 

A self-described anti-speciesist and deep ecologist political party, REV emphasizes the rejection of the commodity status of animals.

REV is an explicitly vegan political party claiming to refuse "the exploitation and the slaughter of non-human animals to satisfy morbid and unnecessary food cravings."

REV sets out four fundamental rights for non-human animals:

 The right to not be killed.

 The right to not be tortured.

 The right to not be locked up.

 The right to not be sold.

To achieve these rights, REV proposes the gradual closure of all meat farms, a ban on hunting and fishing, the closure of non-rehabilitative zoos and aquariums, prohibition of fur production and sale, and closure of pet stores in favor of non-kill animal shelters.

On economic issues, REV takes a social democratic and anti-consumerist stance. It advocates for a 28-hour workweek, a strengthening of the national healthcare system, public banking, a tax on financial transactions, and a maximum income of €480,000 a year.

As an environmentalist political party, REV advocates for the transition to 100% renewable energy, followed by the gradual closure of all nuclear power plants. Additionally it advocates for free public transportation to incentivize low emission transit, a national ban on single-use plastics and the establishment of water as a common good and universal fundamental right, guaranteeing its free access for all.

On social issues, REV takes a pro-immigrant, secular and socially progressive stance. It calls for an end to police brutality, the equal status of men and women, LGBT acceptance, legalization of euthanasia, the creation of a legal route to the Schengen area, zero migrant deaths at European borders, and universal asylum for climate refugees. 

REV also calls for a reformed French democracy, calling for the abolition of the Senate and the office of the President, the replacement of first-past-the-post voting with a proportional representation system, and limitations on the power of lobbies in the political system.

On foreign policy, REV calls for the creation of a global federal government either through the manifestation of a new internationalist organization, or through the reformation of the United Nations. Additionally, REV calls for the gradual abandonment of borders, international nuclear disarmament, the creation of an international regulatory body to ensure trade justice, and the cancelation of "illegitimate debts" owed to developed nations from the developing world.

See also 
 List of political parties in France
 List of animal advocacy parties
 Animalist Party

References

External links 
  Official website

Political parties established in 2018
Political parties of the French Fifth Republic
2018 establishments in France
Animal advocacy parties
Green political parties in France